Yakira, L.L.C. (trade name: Ecko Unltd.) is an American urban fashion company founded by Marc Ecko in 1993. The company makes apparel and accessories under brands including the men's Ecko Unltd. line and the Ecko Red line for girls and women. It is headquartered in New York City. The company's products gained public attention in the late 1990s; they were originally associated with hip hop and skating culture and moved into the mainstream urban culture in the early 2000s. It is most often associated with hip hop. The style is based on graffiti art. Its brand features a rhino as its logo. Rap artist MC Serch of 3rd Bass assisted with marketing in the early years of the company.

History 
Ecko Unltd. is a streetwear brand that was founded by Marc Ecko, an American fashion designer and entrepreneur, in 1993. The brand was originally established as a T-shirt company and quickly gained a following among hip-hop and urban culture enthusiasts. Over the years, Ecko Unltd. expanded its product offerings to include a wide range of clothing and accessories, including jackets, hoodies, jeans, sneakers. In the late 1990s and early 2000s, Ecko Unltd. became known for its bold, graphic designs and its association with hip-hop culture, and gained a reputation as a leading player in the streetwear market. In addition to its fashion offerings, Ecko Unltd. has also been involved in a number of partnerships and collaborations with other brands, artists, and musicians including Spike Lee and Chuck D, as well as having a segment in Good Morning America that featured its T-shirt designs. 

The company later acquired Avirex and Zoo York. In 2009, Ecko Unlimited had over $1 billion in global revenue and was the largest brand in streetwear.

On October 27, 2009, Iconix Brand Group paid $109 million for a 51% stake in Ecko Unlimited. It acquired full ownership in May 2013.

Sponsorships
Ecko Unltd. has sponsored a number of artists, musicians, and athletes over the years as part of its marketing and brand-building efforts. Some of the people and organizations that Ecko Unltd. has sponsored include:

 Musicians: Ecko Unltd. has a strong association with hip-hop and urban culture, and the brand has sponsored and collaborated with a number of musicians and musical events over the years.
 Athletes: Ecko Unltd. has a history of sponsoring athletes and sporting events, and the brand has been involved in a number of partnerships and collaborations with professional athletes, teams, and leagues.
 Streetwear events: Ecko Unltd. has been a sponsor of a number of streetwear and urban culture events, including fashion shows, streetwear exhibitions, and trade shows.

These sponsorships and collaborations are an important part of Ecko Unltd.'s marketing strategy, and they help the brand build relationships with key influencers and stakeholders in the fashion and streetwear communities. By sponsoring and collaborating with a diverse range of artists, musicians, athletes, and events, Ecko Unltd. is able to raise its profile and connect with its target audience.

Skateboarding

• Skater Manny Santiago

Former

Freestyle Motocross

•Country|United States
Mike Metzger
•Country|United States
Jeremy Stenberg

Iconix Brand Group 
In 2009 Iconix Brand Group, an American multinational brand management company, signed a binding deal to buy a majority stake in the Ecko brand portfolio as a part of the company's strategy to expand its portfolio of lifestyle and entertainment brands. Under Iconix's ownership, Ecko Unltd. has continued to expand its product offerings and to build its brand presence both domestically and internationally.

See also 
 Stüssy
Billionaire Boys Club
The Hundreds
Supreme

References

External links 
 

2000s fashion
Clothing brands of the United States
Companies based in Middlesex County, New Jersey
Clothing companies established in 1993
Hip hop fashion
South River, New Jersey
Companies that filed for Chapter 11 bankruptcy in 2014